The 2022 Córdoba Open was a men's tennis tournament played on outdoor clay courts. It was the 4th edition of the Córdoba Open, and part of the ATP Tour 250 series of the 2022 ATP Tour. It took place at the Estadio Mario Alberto Kempes in Córdoba, Argentina, from 31 January until 6 February 2022.

Champions

Singles 

  Albert Ramos Viñolas  def.  Alejandro Tabilo, 4–6, 6–3, 6–4

Doubles 

  Santiago González /  Andrés Molteni def.  Andrej Martin /  Tristan-Samuel Weissborn, 7–5, 6–3

Point and prize money

Point distribution

Prize money 

*per team

Singles main draw entrants

Seeds 

 1 Rankings are as of 17 January 2022.

Other entrants 
The following players received wildcards into the singles main draw:
  Francisco Cerúndolo
  Tomás Martín Etcheverry
  Juan Ignacio Londero

The following players received entry using a protected ranking into the singles main draw:
  Yannick Hanfmann
  Fernando Verdasco

The following players received entry from the qualifying draw:
  Juan Pablo Ficovich
  Nicolás Jarry
  Alejandro Tabilo
  Juan Pablo Varillas

The following player received entry as a lucky loser:
  Daniel Elahi Galán
  Nikola Milojević

Withdrawals 
 Before the tournament
  Juan Manuel Cerúndolo → replaced by  Daniel Elahi Galán
  Pablo Cuevas → replaced by  Hugo Dellien
  Laslo Đere → replaced by  Carlos Taberner
  Fabio Fognini → replaced by  Andrej Martin
  Miomir Kecmanović → replaced by  Holger Rune
  Dominic Thiem → replaced by  Nikola Milojević

Doubles main draw entrants

Seeds 

 1 Rankings are as of 17 January 2022.

Other entrants 
The following players received wildcards into the doubles main draw:
  Pedro Cachín /  Tomás Martín Etcheverry
  Juan Pablo Ficovich /  Facundo Mena

Withdrawals 
 Before the tournament
  Pablo Andújar /  Pedro Martínez → replaced by  Sebastián Báez /  Pedro Martínez
  Tomislav Brkić /  Nikola Ćaćić → replaced by  Orlando Luz /  Thiago Monteiro
  Marcelo Demoliner /  Miomir Kecmanović → replaced by  Andrej Martin /  Tristan-Samuel Weissborn
 Andrey Golubev /  Franko Škugor → replaced by  Luis David Martínez /  Fernando Romboli

References

External links 
Official website

Córdoba Open
Córdoba Open
Córdoba Open
Cordoba Open
Cordoba Open